The Province of Petsamo was a Finnish panhandle. It was a separate province from 1921 to 1922, when it was merged into the Province of Oulu. This panhandle used to give Finland access to the Arctic Ocean, until it was annexed by the Soviet Union in 1944.

In 1921, following Finnish independence and military expansion into neighboring Russian territory (which resulted in the annexation of the formerly Russian districts of Pechenga, Repola and Porajärvi by Finland), Soviet Russia was forced to cede the area of Pechenga to Finland in exchange for the return of Repola and Porajärvi according to the Treaty of Tartu. In 1922, it was merged with the province of Oulu. In 1938, Lapland was separated from the province of Oulu and the area of Petsamo became part of the new province of Lapland. In the Winter War of 1939–1940 the Soviet Union occupied Petsamo, but returned the area to Finland after the Moscow peace agreement of 1940 (Viipuri was ceded to the Soviet Union). In 1944, the whole of the former province of Petsamo was ceded to the Soviet Union as part of the preliminary peace agreement between Finland and the allies.

Later in 1947, the USSR separately bought the small adjacent Jäniskoski-Niskakoski territory from Finland; it was home to a hydroelectric power plant which was destroyed during World War II and the Soviets wished to rebuild it in order to provide power for its Pechenga area.

Maps

Municipalities 
 Petsamo

Governors 
 Ilmari Helenius 1921

Provinces of Finland (1917–97)
1921 establishments in Finland
1922 disestablishments in Finland